Riess spirals, or Knochenhauer spirals, are a pair of spirally wound conductors with metal balls at their ends.  Placing one above the other forms an induction coil.  Heinrich Hertz used them in his discovery of radio waves. They are named for German physicists Peter Theophil Riess and K. W. Knochenhauer.

References

External links
 Riess spiral pair

Laboratory equipment